Eric Bell (27 November 1929 – 22 July 2012) was an English football wing half who played in the 1950s. He only played for one club, Bolton Wanderers, for the whole of his senior career, and made over 100 Football League appearances for them.

He played for Bolton in the 1953 FA Cup Final but was injured during the game. However, he still managed to score, and put Bolton 3–1 up, although they eventually lost to Blackpool 4–3.

Despite success at club level, he failed to receive a call-up for the England national team.

On 22 July 2012 Eric Bell died at the age of 82 after battling with Alzheimer's disease.

Honours

As a player
Bolton Wanderers
 FA Cup winner: 1957–58
 FA Cup finalist: 1952–53

References

1929 births
2012 deaths
English Football League players
Association football wing halves
Bolton Wanderers F.C. players
Footballers from Manchester
English footballers
Deaths from Alzheimer's disease
Deaths from dementia in England
English Football League representative players
FA Cup Final players